Henry Goldthwaite "Ditty" Seibels (August 22, 1876 – September 29, 1967) was a prominent American college football and baseball player and golfer for the Sewanee Tigers of Sewanee: The University of the South, a small Episcopal school in the Tennessee mountain town of Sewanee.

Early years

Seibels was born in Montgomery to Colonel Emmett Seibels and Anne Goldthwaite.

Sewanee

Seibels is best known as the running back and captain on the undefeated 1899 Sewanee Tigers football team. Known as the "Iron Men," they had a six-day road trip with five shutout wins over Texas A&M; Texas; Tulane; LSU; and Ole Miss. Recalled memorably with the phrase "..and on the seventh day they rested." The biggest fear of the road trip was injuries, as players who left a game were not allowed to return. In the very first game of that road trip, with Texas, Seibels got a gash on his forehead which was stuck together with "sticking plaster." Seibels scored two touchdowns in that game, and only missed the Tulane game. He scored a Sewanee record 19 touchdowns in 1899. He was nominated though not selected for an Associated Press All-Time Southeast 1869-1919 era team.   A documentary film about the team and Seibels' role was released in 2022, called "Unrivaled:  Sewanee 1899."

Seibels also captained the baseball team that year; and it too went undefeated. He was elected to the College Football Hall of Fame in 1973, and is also a member of the Sewanee Athletics Hall of Fame. After college, he was headmaster of Sewanee Grammar School and then moved to Birmingham and was in the insurance business. Seibels' athleticism was vast, for in 1922 he was the Alabama state golf champion.  He was awarded an Honorary Degree by the University of the South in 1956.

Seibels died on September 29, 1967 at age 91 and was the oldest surviving member of the Team of 1899.

References

External links
 

1876 births
1967 deaths
19th-century players of American football
American football halfbacks
Sewanee Tigers football players
All-Southern college football players
College Football Hall of Fame inductees
Players of American football from Montgomery, Alabama
Baseball players from Montgomery, Alabama
Sewanee Tigers baseball players
College men's golfers in the United States
Golfers from Alabama